The Social Lion is a 1930 American Pre-Code comedy film directed by A. Edward Sutherland and written by Octavus Roy Cohen, Joseph L. Mankiewicz and Agnes Brand Leahy, and starring Jack Oakie, Mary Brian, Richard "Skeets" Gallagher, Olive Borden, Charles Sellon, Cyril Ring and E. H. Calvert. It was released on June 21, 1930, by Paramount Pictures.

Plot
Marco Perkins is a garage mechanic and a would-be-prizefighter who gets a place on the ritzy country club's polo team because he is the town's most proficient mallet-wielder, having learned to play polo while serving in U.S. army. His hobnobbing with the town-elite and social upper-crust at the polo-matches gives him an inflated idea of his social position, and he decides he is moving on up. He breaks off with his girl-friend, true-blue Cynthia Brown, and hits on débutante Gloria Staunton, who appears to have an interest in being hit upon. Gloria's interest lies mostly in showing marco that hired-hands who can play polo still aren't to the manor born.

Cast
Jack Oakie	as Marco Perkins
Mary Brian as Cynthia Brown
Richard "Skeets" Gallagher as Chick Hathaway 
Olive Borden as Gloria Staunton
Charles Sellon as Jim Perkins
Cyril Ring	as Ralph Williams
E. H. Calvert as Henderson
James Gibson as Howard
Henry Roquemore as Smith
William Bechtel as Schultz
Richard Henry Cummings as McGinnis

References

External links

American comedy films
1930 comedy films
Paramount Pictures films
Films directed by A. Edward Sutherland
American black-and-white films
1930s English-language films
1930s American films